Hustopeče nad Bečvou is a market town in Přerov District in the Olomouc Region of the Czech Republic. It has about 1,700 inhabitants.

Administrative parts
Villages of Hranické Loučky, Poruba and Vysoká are administrative parts of Hustopeče nad Bečvou.

History
The first written mention of Hustopeče nad Bečvou is from 1201. The settlement was promoted to a market town in 1397, when it was owned by the lords of Kravaře.

References

External links

Market towns in the Czech Republic
Populated places in Přerov District